Hans Miilberg (25 May 1945 Sindi – 2 December 2020 Tallinn) was an Estonian opera singer (baritone).

In 1978 he graduated from the Tallinn State Conservatory. From 1972 to 1977 he sang with Estonian Radio's mixed choir, and from 1977 to 2006 at the Estonia Theatre.

Opera roles

 Almaviva (Mozart's "Figaro pulm", 1976) 
 Don Giovanni (Mozart's "Don Giovanni", 1977)
 Chaunard (Puccini's "Boheem", 1977)

References

1945 births
2020 deaths
20th-century Estonian male opera singers
Estonian Academy of Music and Theatre alumni
People from Sindi, Estonia
21st-century Estonian male opera singers